Kristoffer Robin Haug (born 1 August 1984) is a Norwegian politician for the Green Party

He serves as a deputy representative to the Parliament of Norway from Oslo during the term 2017–2021. He took a master's degree in science at the University of Oslo and became involved in borough politics there. Having moved to Ås, in the 2019 Norwegian local elections he was elected to Viken county council and was also County Commissioner of Transport and Communications from 2019 to 2020, when the Green Party left the county cabinet.

References

1984 births
Living people
University of Oslo alumni
Deputy members of the Storting
Green Party (Norway) politicians
Politicians from Oslo
Akershus politicians
People from Ås, Akershus
21st-century Norwegian politicians